Archa is a transliteration of the Tatar name of Arsk, a town in the Republic of Tatarstan, Russia.

Archa may also refer to:

Archa, a beer brewed by ThaiBev
Archa (document store), a mediaeval document repository

See also
Archaea (disambiguation), or Archea
Archery (disambiguation)
Archa Darugha, a division of Kazan Khanate and later of Kazansky Uyezd
Ala-Archa, a river in Kyrgyzstan
On-Archa, a river in Kyrgyzstan